Malcolm Grahame Christie   (27 January 1881 – 3 November 1971), known as either Colonel or Group-Captain Graham Christie, was a British Air Attaché in Berlin from 1927 to 1930 who then worked as an intelligence officer in Germany from 1930 to 1939.

Christie investigated the political situation in Germany in the 1930s, initially as a freelance amateur and then after 1933 on behalf of Permanent Under-Secretary at the Foreign Office Sir Robert Vansittart, who regarded Christie as the best source to provide information on the inner workings of the Nazi Party to the British government. Vanisttart was a part of the SIS but ran what amounted to his own "private detective agency" gathering intelligence on Nazi Germany; "more than any other Whitehall mandarin," Vansittart advocated for British rearmament and against appeasement, and Christie was "by far the most important British member of Vanisttart's network."

Christie had a house on the German-Dutch border, knew Herman Göring and his deputy Erhard Milch personally, and traveled easily in Berlin society. His network of known informants included Carl Goerdeler, Robert Bosch, and Hans Ritter. There was also X, a senior minister in the German Air Ministry who provided information on the Luftwaffe, Dr. Y, "Fish," and "Johnnie," who may have been Hans van Herwarth. "X" provided projected Luftwaffe force numbers for 1936 and 1937, info on aircraft production rates, and technical information such as "engine modifications to the Dornier 17 bomber."

Christie also had slightly advanced notice of the remilitarization of the Rhineland and was told by Göring himself that the Reich had designs on Austria and Czechoslovakia.

In 1935, Christie arranged for Konrad Henlein, the leader of the pro-Nazi Sudeten German Party, to visit London and meet with Vansittart. Henlein successfully used the visit to play the part of the reasonable statesman and to convince the British to put pressure on Czechoslovak officials to accede to the demands of the Sudeten Germans.

Early life
Christie was born in Birmingham, Warwickshire, on 27 January 1881, the son of John and Annabelle Christie, his father was a bank manager. In the 1911 Census of Leeds, Christie is in the Grand Central Hotel and is described as a chemical engineer.

First World War
Christie joined the Royal Flying Corps in 1914 and latter transferred to the Royal Air Force as a Second Lieutenant when it was formed in 1918.

Honours and awards
24 January 1917 - Captain (temporary Major) Malcolm Grahame Christie MC of the Royal Flying Corp, is appointed a Companion of the Distinguished Service Order for valuable service rendered in connection with the war.

Family
A great-nephew of Christie, The Honourable Dr Nicholas Blain, in his book Pilots and Management: Industrial Relations in the UK Airlines (1972), paid tribute to Christie as "one of the earliest pioneers of British aviation".

References

External links 
 The Papers of Group Captain Malcolm Christie held at Churchill Archives Centre, Cambridge

1881 births
1971 deaths
British air attachés
British intelligence operatives
Companions of the Distinguished Service Order
Companions of the Order of St Michael and St George
Recipients of the Military Cross
Royal Air Force personnel of World War II
Royal Flying Corps officers
Royal Air Force personnel of World War I
Military personnel from Birmingham, West Midlands
British expatriates in Germany